Evangelical Wesleyan Bible Institute (EWBI), also informally known as the Evangelical Wesleyan Bible College, is a private four-year Methodist Bible college in Cooperstown, Pennsylvania. It is affiliated with the Evangelical Wesleyan Church (EWC) and was founded to "preserve and propagate that revival of New Testament Christianity - historic Methodism."

Admissions 
Evangelical Wesleyan Bible Institute has an open admissions policy, welcoming "applications from any academically qualified person, regardless of race, color, national or ethnic origin".

Academics 
Evangelical Wesleyan Bible Institute offers an Associate degree in Religion, Bachelor of Christian Ministries, Bachelor of Theology, and a Bachelor of Religious Education. Majors include Christian Ministry, Christian Missions, Sacred Theology, and Christian Education.

Student life 
The Evangelical Wesleyan Bible Institute has an active student choir as well as internship programs with churches affiliated with the Evangelical Wesleyan Church.

References 

Bible colleges
Holiness universities and colleges
Methodist universities and colleges in the United States
Methodism in Pennsylvania
Seminaries and theological colleges in Pennsylvania
1963 establishments in Pennsylvania